Desertmartin Football Club is an intermediate-level football club playing in the Premier division of the Ballymena & Provincial League in Northern Ireland. The club is based in Desertmartin, County Londonderry.

References

External links

Association football clubs in Northern Ireland
Association football clubs in County Londonderry